The Graham Memorial (also the Bungalow Bridge or Shepherd's Hut) is a stone shelter situated between the 30th Milestone and the 31st Milestone road-side markers on the Snaefell Mountain Course on the primary A18 Snaefell mountain road in the parish of Lonan in the Isle of Man.

The shelter is in the style of a small alpine lodge, and was built in 1955 in memorial to Les Graham, the former 500 cc solo motorcycle road racing World Champion. 

During the winter of 1970/1971 road-widening occurred on the A18 Mountain Road at the Verandah by cutting into the hillside.  This also included the corner at the Graham Memorial with the building of an embankment and revetment. The corner is also  referred to as the Bungalow Bridge.

The memorial was part of the Highland Course and Four Inch Course used for the Gordon Bennett Trial and the Tourist Trophy car races held in the Isle of Man between 1904 and 1922, and part of the Snaefell Mountain Course used since 1911 for the Isle of Man TT and from 1923 for the Manx Grand Prix races.

Sources

External links
 Bungalow Bridge to Thirty Third Milestone with Steve Hislop, 11 times TT winner
 TT Spectator Guide Section The Bungalow to Kate's Cottage
 Map of course

Roads in the Isle of Man